Syntomodrillia lissotropis is a species of sea snail, a marine gastropod mollusk in the family Drilliidae.

Description
The length of the shell attains 4.5 mm, its diameter 1.75 mm.

Original description, under the name P. (Mangilia) lissotropis, otherwise Mangilia lissotropis:

Distribution
This marine species occurs in the Caribbean Sea and off Southern Brasil.

References

 Rosenberg G., Moretzsohn F. & García E. F. (2009). Gastropoda (Mollusca) of the Gulf of Mexico, Pp. 579–699 in Felder, D.L. and D.K. Camp (eds.), Gulf of Mexico–Origins, Waters, and Biota. Biodiversity. Texas A&M Press, College Station, Texas

External links
 
  Tucker, J.K. 2004 Catalog of recent and fossil turrids (Mollusca: Gastropoda). Zootaxa 682:1–1295.

lissotropis
Gastropods described in 1881